SWI/SNF-related matrix-associated actin-dependent regulator of chromatin subfamily D member 1 is a protein that in humans is encoded by the SMARCD1 gene.

The protein encoded by this gene is a member of the SWI/SNF family of proteins, whose members display helicase and ATPase activities and which are thought to regulate transcription of certain genes by altering the chromatin structure around those genes. The encoded protein is part of the large ATP-dependent chromatin remodeling complex SNF/SWI and has sequence similarity to the yeast Swp73 protein. Two transcript variants encoding different isoforms have been found for this gene.

Interactions
SMARCD1 has been shown to interact with Glucocorticoid receptor.

References

Further reading